The Pollen Ministry was a responsible government which held power in New Zealand from July 1875 to February 1876 while Julius Vogel was in London.

Background
Julius Vogel, who had been Premier since 1873 and Colonial Treasurer for almost all of the time since 1869, went to London in July 1875 to negotiate a £4 million loan to be spent on public works and immigration, leaving Daniel Pollen in charge. Harry Atkinson became Treasurer in the interim and his cautious policy was to cease announcing new railway projects and stop servicing interest payments out of loan money.  

In 1875 Sir George Grey launched a campaign against the sale of the Piako Swamp to a syndicate led by Bank of New Zealand founder Thomas Russell. This low-value land had been confiscated from its Maori owners during the New Zealand Wars and should have been auctioned off - in fact it was sold directly to the syndicate for 5 shillings per acre on condition that they build a road through it. Pollen, in his former role as Commissioner of Confiscated Lands, had been deeply involved in the sale. 

Grey had been the Governor of New Zealand in the 1850s and had designed the Provinces of New Zealand. He led the provincialist faction in the House and forced the Government to compromise on their intention to abolish the provinces: implementation of the abolition would have to wait until after a general election. Pollen won this election in Vogel's absence, and handed back the premiership upon his return.

Ministers
The following members served in the Pollen Ministry:

See also
 New Zealand Government

Notes

References

Ministries of Queen Victoria
Governments of New Zealand
1875 establishments in New Zealand
Pollen Ministry
Pollen Ministry